Hășdate may refer to several places in Romania:

 Hășdate, a village in the town of Gherla, Cluj County
 Hășdate, a village in Săvădisla Commune, Cluj County
 Hășdate (river), a river in Cluj County